Adrian Stawski (born 26 December 1978) is a Polish professional football manager and former player who was most recently in charge of Polish club Stomil Olsztyn.

Career
Stawski started his managerial career with Polish seventh division side Urania Udorpie in 2004, helping them achieve promotion to the Polish sixth division. In 2017, Stawski was appointed manager of Bytovia Bytów in the Polish second division, where he suffered relegation to the Polish third division.

On 24 June 2021, he was appointed head coach of Stomil Olsztyn on a one-year contract. On 22 March 2022, he was dismissed from his post.

References

External links
 

1978 births
Living people
Polish footballers
Polish football managers
Bytovia Bytów managers
OKS Stomil Olsztyn managers
II liga managers
I liga managers
Association footballers not categorized by position